The Comandante Ferraz Antarctic Station is a permanent Antarctic research station named after the Brazilian Navy Commander Luís Antônio de Carvalho Ferraz (1940-1982), who visited Antarctica many times with the British exploration team and managed to convince his government to create a self-guided Brazilian Antarctic Program.

Located in Admiralty Bay, King George Island, near the tip of the Antarctic Peninsula, 130 km north of the peninsula, the station began operating on 6 February 1984, brought to Antarctica in modules by the oceanographic ship Barão de Teffé and several other Brazilian naval ships. It now houses about 64 people, including researchers, technicians and staff, military and civilians.

History
The station was named after Navy Commander Luís Antônio de Carvalho Ferraz, a hydrographer and oceanographer who visited Antarctica twice on British vessels. He was instrumental in persuading his country's government to develop an Antarctic program, and died suddenly in 1982 while representing Brazil at an oceanographic conference in Halifax, Nova Scotia. 

The station was built on the site of the old British "Base G", and the weathered wooden structures of the old base made a sharp contrast with the bright green and orange metal structures of the Brazilian station, which was first set up on 6 February 1984. Above the site of the base there is a small cemetery with five crosses: three of them are the graves of British Antarctic Survey (BAS) personnel; the fourth commemorates a BAS base leader lost at sea, and the fifth cross is the grave of a Brazilian radio operator sergeant who died of a heart attack in 1990.

2012 fire

On 25 February 2012, an explosion in the machine room that housed the station's generators ignited a fire that, according to the Brazilian navy, destroyed approximately 70% of the complex. Two soldiers, originally reported as missing by the Brazilian navy, were found dead in the debris of the station after the fire, while a third one sustained non-life-threatening injuries. 
Material damage to the base was calculated at US$12.4 million. At the time of the incident, the Brazilian government estimated it would take two years to rebuild the research station.

In August 2012, the station was fully dismantled, with approximately 800 tonnes of debris being shipped back to Brazil. The construction of the temporary station was completed in May 2013.

On 15 April 2013, the Brazilian Navy announced it had chosen the winning design for the new Comandante Ferraz base. The winning proposal went to the Curitiba-based Estúdio 41 architecture firm. The new station will extend  and will accommodate 64 people. The cost of the project was approximately US$100 million. Approximately 200 Chinese workers from CEIEC were at the construction site. The new and modern station opened in January 2020.

New base
In January 2020, the new station was successfully completed. The opening ceremony, originally scheduled to take place on 14 January, was postponed until the following day due to inadequate weather conditions hampering the transport of dignitaries from Punta Arenas, Chile, to Antarctica. On 15 January, the opening ceremony was held in the presence of the Vice President of Brazil Hamilton Mourão among other guests. “Brazil is back in the Antarctic with great force,” said the Science and Technology Minister Marcos Pontes, Brazil's only astronaut. Pontes said the new 4,500-square-metre (48,375-sq-foot) facility was bigger and safer, with 17 laboratories, a heliport, and other advances. Scientists will use the base to study microbiology, glaciers, and climate, among other areas.

Climate
With all 12 months having an average temperature below 10 °C (50 °F), Comandante Ferraz Antarctic Station features a tundra climate (Köppen ET). The average temperature at the station is of about -1.8 °C; however, in the region of the Thiel Mountains, where the new station Criosfera 1 was built, the temperature may drop to -35 °C.

Activity

The main objective of the Brazilian Antarctic program lies on climate change research, such as global warming, the greenhouse effect, ozone depletion and the raising level of the oceans. The personnel working at the station collect samples of pollutants which often come from overseas. They also carry out research in meteorology, continental and marine geology, oceanography, astrophysics, geomagnetism, and nuclear geophysics.

Outposts
Near the station are located several smaller structures which administratively and logistically depend on the main base:

Refuge Astronomer Cruls.
Refuge Emílio Goeldi.
Refuge Engineer Wiltgen (dismantled).
Refuge Pe. Balduino Rambo (dismantled).

See also
 List of lighthouses in Antarctica
 List of Antarctic research stations
 List of Antarctic field camps
Brazilian Antarctic Program

Notes

References

Further reading
Child, Jack. Antarctica and South American Geopolitics: Frozen Lebensraum. New York: Praeger Publishers, 1988.
 Menezes, Eurípides, A Antártica e os Desafios do Futuro. Rio de Janeiro: Capemi Editora, 1982.
 Castro, Therezinha, Atlas-Texto de Geopolítica do Brasil. Rio de Janeiro: Capemi Editora, 1982.

External links

Official website Projeto de Meteorologia Antártica
 Official website Programa Antártico Brasileiro
Comandante Ferraz Brazilian Station webcam
COMNAP Antarctic Facilities Map

Outposts of the South Shetland Islands
Brazilian Antarctica
King George Island (South Shetland Islands)
1984 establishments in Antarctica